The scarlet-hooded barbet (Eubucco tucinkae) is a species of bird in the family Capitonidae, the New World barbets. It is found in Bolivia, Brazil, and Peru.

Taxonomy and systematics

The scarlet-hooded barbet is monotypic. 

At times it was thought to be closely related to the red-headed barbet (Eubucco bourceirii) and possibly conspecific, but it is treated now as a full species with no close relatives even within its genus.

Description

The male's entire head, throat, and upper mantle are red but for a bit of black around the eye and bill. The rest of the upperparts are green. Its lower breast is orange and yellow; it has a gray patch on the side and the flanks are streaked with olive. Most of the female's head is also red, but the throat is yellow. It has an orange band on the upper breast and the rest of the underparts are like the male's.

Distribution and habitat

The scarlet-hooded barbet is found in the upper Amazon Basin where eastern Peru, western Brazil, and a bit of western Bolivia meet. More than half of its range is in Peru. It can also be found in overgrown gardens near rivers and on river islands.

Behavior

Feeding

The scarlet-hooded barbet's diet is approximately 60% fruits such as figs and Cecropia  seeds and 40% insects and other arthropods of many kinds. It also eats flowers and nectar. It joins mixed-species foraging flocks.

Breeding

The scarlet-hooded barbet nests in Peru in July and possibly. Like all New World barbets, it excavates a nest hole, usually in a tree, but virtually nothing else is known about its breeding phenology.

Vocalization

The scarlet-hooded barbet's song is "a fast 'oop-oop-oop-'" .

Status

The IUCN has assessed the scarlet-hooded barbet as being of Least Concern. However, "[further] data [are] required on its breeding habits and requirements."

References

scarlet-hooded barbet
Birds of the Brazilian Amazon
Birds of the Bolivian Amazon
Birds of the Peruvian Amazon
scarlet-hooded barbet
Taxonomy articles created by Polbot